Howard Blum (born 1948) is an American author and journalist. Formerly a reporter for The Village Voice and The New York Times, Blum is a contributing editor at Vanity Fair and the author of several non-fiction books, including the New York Times bestseller and Edgar Award winner American Lightning.

Career 
In 1986, Blum began working as a reporter for the New York Times, where he earned two Pulitzer Prize nominations.  Since 1994, Blum has been a contributing editor to Vanity Fair. Several of his books were non-fiction bestsellers, including Gangland, Wanted, The Gold of Exodus, and The Brigade: An Epic Story of Vengeance, Salvation, and WWII. Additionally, a number of his works have been optioned for film. Miramax Films is in the process of making The Brigade into a major motion picture.

Personal life 
Blum is the son of Harold K. Blum (1917–1984), an executive at the Kane Miller Corporation in Tarrytown, New York, and Gertrude Blum, a schoolteacher in New York City. For high school, Blum attended the Horace Mann School and earned his undergraduate degree from Stanford University, where he also received an M.A. in government in 1970. In January 1991, he married Jenny Cox, a book editor. They are divorced. He currently resides in Sag Harbor, New York and Connecticut. Howard is the brother of celebrity wedding planner Marcy Blum.

Bibliography

 Wishful Thinking (1985), New York: Atheneum Books, 
 I Pledge Allegiance--: The True Story of the Walkers: An American Spy Family (1987), New York: Simon & Schuster, 
 Wanted!: The Search for Nazis in America (1989), New York: Simon & Schuster, 
 Out There: The Government's Secret Quest for Extraterrestrials (1990), New York, Simon & Schuster, 
 Gangland: How the FBI Broke the Mob (1993), New York: Pocket Books,  
 The Gold of Exodus: The Discovery of the True Mount Sinai (1998), New York: Simon & Schuster, 
 The Brigade: An Epic Story of Vengeance, Salvation, and World War II (2001), New York: HarperCollins, 
 The Eve of Destruction: The Untold Story of the Yom Kippur War (2003), New York: HarperCollins, 
 American Lightning: Terror, Mystery, the Birth of Hollywood, and the Crime of the Century (2008), New York: Crown Publishers, 
 The Floor of Heaven: A True Tale of the Last Frontier and the Yukon Gold Rush (2011), New York: Crown Publishers, 
 Dark Invasion: 1915: Germany’s Secret War and the Hunt for the First Terrorist Cell in America  (2014), New York: Crown Publishers, 
 The Last Goodnight: A World War II Story of Espionage, Adventure, and Betrayal (2016), HarperCollins, 
 In the Enemy's House: The Secret Saga of the FBI Agent and the Code Breaker Who Caught the Russian Spies (2018), HarperCollins Publishers, 
Night of the Assassins: The Untold Story of Hitler's Plot to Kill FDR, Churchill, and Stalin (2020), HarperCollins Publishers.
The Spy Who Knew Too Much: An Ex-CIA Officer's Quest Through a Legacy of Betrayal (2022), HarperCollins Publishers,

See also

References

External links
 Howard Blum at Library of Congress Authorities — with 16 catalog records

 

1948 births
American non-fiction crime writers
American historians of espionage
Stanford University alumni
Historians of World War II
Living people
Date of birth missing (living people)
Place of birth missing (living people)
People from Sag Harbor, New York
Historians from New York (state)